Peronema is a genus of flowering plant in the family Lamiaceae, first described in 1822. It contains only one known species, Peronema canescens, native to Thailand, Malaysia, Borneo, Sumatra, and Java.

References

Lamiaceae
Monotypic Lamiaceae genera
Flora of Thailand
Flora of Malesia